Guillaume Ouellet (born 3 October 1986) is a Canadian para-athlete competing in T13 middle and long-distance races.

Career history
Ouellet began took up athletics in 2011 at college. In 2013 he was selected to represent Canada at the 2013 World Championships in Lyon in the 1500 metres race, finishing fourth. Two years later he was back in the Canadian team to compete at his second World Championships, this time in Doha. He competed in both the 1,500m and 5,000m, winning gold in the latter, with a time of 15:07.64.

At the 2017 World Para Athletics Championships held in London, United Kingdom he won the bronze medal in the men's 5000 metres T13 event.

References

External links
 
 

1986 births
Living people
Visually impaired category Paralympic competitors
Canadian male middle-distance runners
Canadian male long-distance runners
People from Sorel-Tracy
People from Victoriaville
Paralympic track and field athletes of Canada
Athletes (track and field) at the 2016 Summer Paralympics
Medalists at the 2015 Parapan American Games
Medalists at the 2019 Parapan American Games
World Para Athletics Championships winners
Athletes (track and field) at the 2020 Summer Paralympics
Canadian blind people